Les Maskoutains is a regional county municipality in the Montérégie region in southwestern Quebec, Canada. Its seat is in Saint-Hyacinthe.

The name comes from Algonquin word maskutew meaning "bear plain" in plular.

Subdivisions
There are 17 subdivisions within the RCM:

Cities & Towns (2)
 Saint-Hyacinthe
 Saint-Pie

Municipalities (13)
 La Présentation
 Saint-Barnabé-Sud
 Saint-Bernard-de-Michaudville
 Saint-Damase
 Saint-Dominique
 Saint-Hugues
 Saint-Jude
 Saint-Liboire
 Saint-Louis
 Saint-Marcel-de-Richelieu
 Saint-Simon
 Saint-Valérien-de-Milton
 Sainte-Hélène-de-Bagot

Parishes (1)
 Sainte-Marie-Madeleine

Villages (1)
 Sainte-Madeleine

Demographics

Population

Language

Transportation

Access Routes
Highways and numbered routes that run through the municipality, including external routes that start or finish at the county border:

 Autoroutes
 

 Principal Highways
 
 

 Secondary Highways
 
 
 
 
 
 
 
 

 External Routes
 None

See also
 List of regional county municipalities and equivalent territories in Quebec

References

 
Census divisions of Quebec